Maudsley is a surname. Notable people with the surname include:

 Henry Maudsley (1835–1918), English psychiatrist
 Robert Maudsley (born 1953), British serial killer
 Ron Maudsley (1918–1981), British law professor and cricketer
 Tony Maudsley (born 1968), English actor

See also
 Maudsley Hospital
 Maudslay (disambiguation)
 Mawdsley